The men's bantamweight (54 kg/118.8 lbs) Full-Contact category at the W.A.K.O. World Championships 2007 in Coimbra was the second lightest of the male Full-Contact tournaments, involving just seven fighters from two continents (Europe and Asia).  Each of the matches was three rounds of two minutes each and were fought under Full-Contact rules.   

As there was one too few men for a tournament designed for eight, one of the fighters had a bye through to the semi finals.  The tournament champion was Kazak Miras Brimzhanov who defeated Sergiy Chezkaskyy from Ukraine in the final by unanimous decision.  Defeated semi finalists Turkey's Barış Fidanoğlu (who did not record any wins) and Spain's Raúl Pandiella Gutiérrez won bronze medals.

Results

Key

See also
List of WAKO Amateur World Championships
List of WAKO Amateur European Championships
List of male kickboxers

References

External links
 WAKO World Association of Kickboxing Organizations Official Site

Kickboxing events at the WAKO World Championships 2007 Coimbra
2007 in kickboxing
Kickboxing in Portugal